Dichomeris parallelosa is a moth in the family Gelechiidae. It was described by Kyu-Tek Park and Margarita Gennadievna Ponomarenko in 1998. It is found in Thailand.

The wingspan is 11-11.5 mm. The forewings are light brown on the upper one-third and dark brown on the lower two-thirds of the wing, without distinct markings. The hindwings are grey.

References

Moths described in 1998
parallelosa